Jonathan Hardy (20 September 1940 – 30 July 2012) was a New Zealand-Australian film and television actor, writer and director, he worked also in Australia.

Early career 
Hardy was born in New Zealand in Wellington and began his training at the New Zealand Players' Drama School. He traveled to Britain where he studied at the London Academy of Music and Dramatic Art (LAMDA)  and was a gold medal student. This brought interest from the Royal Shakespeare Company and the Royal National Theatre where he secured contracts.

He returned to his home of New Zealand in a touring production of The Comedy of Errors with the Royal Shakespeare Company (1966) and remained to help expand the country's theatre industry. He emigrated to Australia in 1972.

Career 1972-2012 
Jonathan Hardy had a long and very successful career for over 40 years.  He appeared in over 20 films, guested in over 26 television series, acted in many television movies and mini-series.

His preference was to work on stage and had long engagements with major theatre companies in both Melbourne and Sydney.

His roles ranged from a Christmas pantomime of Cinderella,  Shakespeare, topical plays such as And in the End : The Life and Death of John Lennon and roles in operas.

Throughout his career, he worked across these media at the same time, demonstrating his versatility and ability to meet the demand of any roles offered.

Theatre 
Hardy was part of the cast in the first public performance of Kenneth G. Ross's important Australian play Breaker Morant, presented by the Melbourne Theatre Company at the Athenaeum Theatre, in Melbourne, Victoria, Australia, on Thursday, 2 February 1978.

In his obituary he is quoted by Mark Juddery as saying, The actor is in control in the theatre,..., so the theatre is much more an actor's medium. also, Television is not anything but an actor's image, ... If my image happens to fit, then I do the job. Whereas on stage you can create an illusion, on television … it's pretty cliched.

Film
Hardy's film work included The Devil's Playground  (1976) which he was nominated for an Australian Film Institute award, Mad Max, Mr. Reliable and Moulin Rouge!.

Along with David Stevens and Bruce Beresford he co-wrote the screenplay for the film Breaker Morant: for which he received an Australian Film Institute award (1980), and was nominated for an Academy Award (1981).

At , he was the co-winner of Best Artistic Contribution for Scarecrow (1982) He also won a New Zealand Film and TV Award in 2001 for Best Short Film Performance for Camping with Camus.

Hardy directed and wrote the movie Backstage starring the Grammy nominated pop vocalist Laura Branigan.

He is best known to international audiences, for providing the voice of Dominar Rygel XVI in the science fiction series Farscape. Farscape was filmed in Australia but was a US production and although it was unsuccessful in Australia, Hardy developed a cult following.

Awards 
1993 Matilda Award Winner for performance - Romeo and Juliet, The Shaughraun

Private life 
Hardy's partner for over 40 years was actor-director David Letch. They worked on many projects together. Hardy had a successful heart transplant.

Death
Hardy died, aged 71, at his home in the Southern Highlands of New South Wales on 30 July 2012.

Selected filmography - features 
 Moving On (1947) - Anne's Boyfriend
 The Adventures of Barry McKenzie (1972) - Groove Courtenay
 The Devil's Playground (1976) - Brother Arnold
 The Mango Tree (1977) - Joe Speight
 Mad Max (1979) - Police Commissioner Labatouche (as Jonathon Hardy)
 Klynham Summer also known as The Scarecrow (1982) - Charlie Dabney
 Lonely Hearts (1982) - Bruce
 Constance (1984) - Randolf Grieve
 Death Warmed Up (1984) - Ranji Gandhi
 Wills & Burke (1985) - John Macadam
 My Letter to George (also known as Mesmerized) (1985) - Burley
 Lie of the Land (1985) - Doctor Max Steiner
 The Delinquents (1989) - Magistrate
 Bloodmoon (1989) - Mayor
 Terrain (1994)
 Tunnel Vision (1995) - Henry Adams
 Mr. Reliable (1996) - Reverend McIntyre
 Ned Kelly (2003) - The Great Orlando
 Wishbone (2006) - Homeless Man
 Moulin Rouge! (2001) - Man In The Moon
 Severance (2015) - Therapy Group

Selected filmography - Television  

1972 Mandog (TV Series) 5 episodes

1974 Rush (TV Series) 1 episode

1976 Andra  (TV Series) 8 episodes

1976 Power Without Glory (TV Series) 3 episodes

1977 Bluey (TV Series) 1 episode

1977 Young Ramsay (TV Series) 1 episode

The Trial of Ned Kelly (TV Movie)

1978 The Truckies (TV Series) 1 episode

1978 Against the Wind (TV Mini-Series)

1979 The John Sullivan Story (TV Movie)

1980-81 Prisoner: Cell Block H (TV Series) 3 episodes

1981 Under the Mountain (TV Series) (as Jonathon Hardy) 1 episode

1983 Nearly No Christmas (TV Movie)

1984 Heroes (TV Series) 2 episodes

1989 Mission: Impossible (TV Series) 1 episode

1990 The Flying Doctors (TV Series) 1 episode

A Country Practice (TV Series) 1 episode

1992 The Adventures of Skippy (TV Series) 2 episodes

1995 G.P. (TV Series) 1 episode

1995 Mission Top Secret (TV Series) 1 episode

1996 Twisted (TV Series) 1 episode

The Thorn Birds: The Missing Years (TV Movie)

Snowy River: The McGregor Saga (TV Series) 1 episode

Medivac (TV Series)  1 episode

1997 Terrain (TV Movie)

1998 All Saints (TV Series) 1 episode

State Coroner (TV Series) 1 episode

2000 Above the Law (TV Series) 1 episode

1999-2003 Farscape (TV Series)  Voice of Dominar Rygel XVI 86 episodes

2003 The Secret Life of Us (TV Series) 1 episode

Stingers (TV Series) 1 episode

MDA (TV Series)  2 episodes

2004 Farscape: The Peacekeeper Wars (TV Mini-Series) Voice of Dominar Rygel XVI

2012 Magical Tales (TV Series) 1 episode (final television appearance)

Selected acting performances Australia  
1972 Flash Jim Vaux (Nimrod Theatre Company); The Last Supper Show (Nimrod Theatre Company)

1973 Jumpers (Melbourne Theatre Company); The Prisoner Of Second Avenue (Melbourne Theatre Company); The Plough and the Star (Melbourne Theatre Company); Batman's Beach-Head (Melbourne Theatre Company); Paying The Piper (Melbourne Theatre Company); The Last of the Knucklemen (Melbourne Theatre Company); Flash Jim Vaux (Melbourne Theatre Company)

1974 The Last of the Knucklemen touring production (Melbourne Theatre Company); Coralie Lansdowne Says No (Melbourne Theatre Company)

1977 The Merchant of Venice (Melbourne Theatre Company); Cop Out (Melbourne Theatre Company)

1978 Breaker Morant (Melbourne Theatre Company); Richard III (Melbourne Theatre Company); The Beaux' Stratagem (Melbourne Theatre Company); Fools' Shoe Hotel (Australian Performing Group)

1979 The Immortalist (Hoopla Theatre Foundation); The Alchemist (Melbourne Theatre Company); Hamlet (Melbourne Theatre Company); Cinderella (Melbourne Theatre Company)

1980 Rosencrantz and Guildenstern are Dead  (Melbourne Theatre Company); Hamlet (Melbourne Theatre Company); Comedians (Mercury Theatre, Auckland, New Zealand)

1991 The Crucible (Royal Queensland Theatre Company)

1992 Shadow and Splendour (Royal Queensland Theatre Company); Twelfth Night; Hotel Sorrento (Royal Queensland Theatre Company)

1993 The Beaux Stratagem (Royal Queensland Theatre Company); Romeo and Juliet (Queensland Theatre Company); The Shaughraun or The Loveable Rascal (Queensland Theatre Company); A Christmas Carol (Oxford Productions International); And a Nightingale Sang (Queensland Theatre Company)

1994 Hysteria, or Fragments of an Analysis of an Obsessional Mind (Melbourne Theatre Company); The Shaughraun (The Lovable Rascal) (Melbourne Theatre Company);

1995 Rosencrantz and Guildenstern are Dead (Pork Chop Productions);  The Shaughraun (The Lovable Rascal) (Melbourne Theatre Company)

1996 The Surgical Table (Renegade Theatre); Smpatico (Sydney Theatre Company); The Life of Galileo (Sydney Theatre Company); Coriolanus  touring production (Bell Shakespeare Company)

1997 Pygmalion (Sydney Theatre Company); QTC Oz Shorts 1 (Queensland Theatre Company);

2002 Great Expectations (Melbourne Theatre Company)

2003  A Tree, Falling (Chapel off Chapel)

2004 12th Night touring production  (Bell Shakespeare Company); One Flea Spare (Queensize Productions)

2005 Treemonisha narrator (The Queensland Choir); The Department Store (Parnassus' Den)

2006 And in the End : The Life and Death of John Lennon (The Walrius Group); Renaissance (Parnassus' Den)

2007 Paul (Company B Belvoir)

Selected singing performances Australia  
1975 The Double Dealer  (Melbourne Theatre Company)

1976 Don Pasquale (Victorian Opera Company)

1998 Tannhauser (Opera Australia)

Selected productions as director/producer Australia  
1974 The Importance of Being Earnest (Melbourne Theatre Company) Director

1976 The Italian Girl in Algiers (Victoria State Opera) Director

1979 The Marriage of Figaro (Canberra Opera Society) Producer

1980 Nine Little Australians! Season Two (Melbourne Theatre Company) Director

Selected productions as playwright/adaptor Australia  
1976 The Diary of a Madman (Melbourne Theatre Company)  also appeared as an actor Adaptor

1997 Jungfrau (Playbox Theatre Company) Writer

References

1940 births
2012 deaths
Australian male television actors
Australian male film actors
Heart transplant recipients
New Zealand male television actors
New Zealand male film actors
New Zealand emigrants to Australia